The 2015–16 Antigua and Barbuda Premier Division was the 45th season of the competition. Hoppers won the title.

Table

Antigua and Barbuda Premier Division seasons
2015–16 in Caribbean football leagues
2015–16 in Antigua and Barbuda football